Remade in Misery is the seventh studio album by American metalcore band Memphis May Fire. It was released on June 3, 2022 through Rise Records and was produced by Kellen McGregor, the band's guitarist. The album was released four years after the band's sixth studio album, Broken (2018), their longest gap between albums and marks a return to their metalcore and post-hardcore sound.

Background and promotion
In early 2020, frontman Matty Mullins stated he had started work on new Memphis May Fire music as well as his solo material, and that it would mark a return to their heavier roots. On June 3, 2021, the band released a new single titled "Blood & Water" which confirmed a return to their earlier, heavier sound.

Over the course of late 2021 and early 2022, the band released more singles; "Death Inside", "Bleed Me Dry", "Somebody", "Left for Dead", and "The American Dream". On February 18, 2022, the band released another single entitled "Make Believe" whilst also announcing the album itself along with the track list, cover art, and release date. On April 1, 2022, the band released another single entitled "Only Human" featuring AJ Channer from Fire from the Gods.

The album's final pre-release single "Your Turn" was released on May 6, 2022. Vocalist Matty Mullins commented on the song:

Critical reception

The only two non-single tracks in the album are "Misery" and "The Fight Within", both of which were stated in the HM review for the album to "offer an encouraging perspective of the growth that comes from the hardships of life. In a genre that can dwell on only the negatives of the human experience, Memphis May Fire shines the attention on the light at the end of the tunnel."

Track listing

Personnel
Memphis May Fire
 Matty Mullins – lead vocals, composition
 Kellen McGregor – guitars, backing vocals, keyboards, programming, production, composition
 Cory Elder – bass
 Jake Garland – drums

Additional musicians
 AJ Channer of Fire from the Gods – guest vocals on track 10

Additional personnel
 Cameron Mizell – vocal production
 Brad Blackwood – engineering
 Akil Channer and Cody Quistad – composition

References

2022 albums
Memphis May Fire albums
Rise Records albums